A love egg is a type of egg or bullet shaped vibrator that is used for stimulation. They can also be referred to as egg vibrators or bullet vibrators, depending on their shape. They are typically weaker than larger external vibrators, such as wands, but are still popular due to their lower price and discreet nature. The primary purpose of these vibrators is targeted stimulation of internal or external erogenous zones.

Structure
The device consists of an egg- or bullet-shaped vibrating item, which can be wireless or connected to an external battery pack. Some wireless varieties can be controlled using a remote. There are also microchip controlled devices which can provide various patterns or irregularities in vibration.

Materials
Love eggs can be made of rubber, silicone, metal, plastic, glass or composites, and are available in a wide variety of colors. Some types can be used with external sleeves, which are usually made from a soft material like silicone, rubber or jelly.

See also
Hitachi Magic Wand

References

Vibrators